Marcy-Holmes is a defined neighborhood in the U.S. city of Minneapolis. The majority of the area is residential and sits upon a bluff overlooking the river and the city skyline. However, a small section of the neighborhood along the river is an industrial zone. 

The neighborhood is bordered on the south by the Mississippi River, to the east by the University of Minnesota and 15th Avenue Southeast, to the north by the railroad tracks that separate it from the Como Neighborhood, and to the west by Central Avenue. Although somewhat confusing to newcomers, the Marcy-Holmes neighborhood is considered part of Southeast Minneapolis, despite its seemingly centralized location within the city today. Almost every street and avenue within the neighborhood is labeled "SE"-  South of East Hennepin Avenue and East of the Mississippi River. Entirely within Minneapolis' Ward 3, Marcy-Holmes is represented by City Council member Michael Rainville. The neighborhood is named after Marcy Park and Holmes Park (themselves named in honor of William L. Marcy and Oliver Wendell Holmes) which are located within the neighborhood.

Marcy-Holmes is well known for its diverse community, its commercial districts, St. Anthony Main and Dinkytown, and its immediate proximity to the East Bank of the University of Minnesota-Twin Cities campus.

Demographics
In 2020, Marcy-Holmes had a population of 15,149. About 80% of residents 5 and older speak English at home. 17.4% of residents are foreign born. Over 86% of households are renter-occupied.  

 White 71.9%
 Black 6.6%
 American Indian and Alaska Natives 0.6%
 Asian 10.3%
 Hispanic 5.3%
 Other 0.4%
 Two or more 4.8%

Landmarks
B. O. Cutter House
Marcy-Holmes Community Garden
Stone Arch Bridge
Sixth Avenue Gateway
Florence Court
Frey Mansion
First Congregational Church

Historic Districts 

 Fifth Street Southeast
 St. Anthony Falls
 University of MN Greek Letter Chapter House
 Dinkytown Commercial

Image gallery

In popular culture
Marcy Open School, located in the neighborhood, is the namesake for the band Marcy Playground, which the band's lead singer attended.

References

External links
Marcy-Holmes Neighborhood Association
Marcy-Holmes Profile at City of Minneapolis website
Marcy-Holmes at Placeography
Florence Court profile, Minneapolis Heritage Preservation Commission

Minnesota populated places on the Mississippi River
Neighborhoods in Minneapolis